Sukhavana Meditation Monastery is a monastery in the Thai Forest Tradition of the Theravada lineage of Buddhism. Sukhavana Meditation Monastery is a centre of teaching and practice. It is located in the Bercham Cave, Ipoh, Perak, Malaysia. Sukhavana means "The Mountain Of Happiness " in Pāli, the Buddhist scriptural language of the ancient Canon. The temple was founded by the disciples of the noted Thai Buddhist Monk.
Its current abbot is Ajahn Tong Bai.

Sukhavana Meditation Monastery also has a retreat centre, where meditation retreats of varying lengths are held for lay people, and which is run on donations.

See also
 Buddhism in Malaysia

External links
www.sukhavana.org

Buddhist temples and monasteries of the Thai Forest Tradition
Buddhism in Malaysia
Buildings and structures in Ipoh
Thai diaspora in Malaysia